Aliaksei Shamarau' (born September 16, 1982 in Kaliningrad) is a Russian male freestyle wrestler who competing for Belarus.

World Champion 2011 and runner-up European Games 2015.

References

External links
 

Living people
1982 births
Belarusian male sport wrestlers
Wrestlers at the 2012 Summer Olympics
Olympic wrestlers of Belarus
European Games silver medalists for Belarus
European Games medalists in wrestling
World Wrestling Championships medalists
Wrestlers at the 2015 European Games